Tandoori chicken is a South Asian dish of chicken marinated in yogurt and spices and roasted in a tandoor, a cylindrical clay oven. The dish is now popular world-wide. The modern form of the dish was popularized by the Moti Mahal restaurant in New Delhi in the late 1940s.

Origin
Dishes similar to tandoori chicken may have existed during the Harappan civilization during the Bronze Age of India. According to the archeologist Professor Vasant Shinde, the earliest evidence for a dish similar to tandoori chicken can be found in the Harappan civilization and dates back to 3000 BC. His team has found ancient ovens at Harappan sites which are similar to the tandoors that are used in the state of Punjab. Physical remains of chicken bones with char marks have also been unearthed. Harappan houses had keyhole ovens with central pillars which was used for roasting meats and baking breads. Sushruta Samhita records meat being cooked in an oven (kandu) after marinating it in spices like black mustard (rai) powder and fragrant spices. According to Ahmed (2014), Harappan oven structures may have operated in a similar manner to the modern tandoors of the Punjab.

Tandoori chicken as a dish originated in the Punjab before the independence of partition of India. In the late 1940s, tandoori chicken was popularised at Moti Mahal in the locality of Daryaganj in New Delhi by Kundan Lal Jaggi and Kundan Lal Gujral, who were Punjabi Hindu migrants from Peshawar as well as the founders of the Moti Mahal restaurant. Mokha Singh had founded the restaurant in the Peshawar area of British India, which is now a part of neighbouring Pakistan.

In the United States, tandoori chicken began appearing on menus by the 1960s. Jacqueline Kennedy was reported to have eaten "chicken tandoori" on a flight from Rome to Bombay in 1962. A recipe for tandoori chicken was printed in the Los Angeles Times in 1963, for "the hostess in search of a fresh idea for a party dinner"; a similar recipe was featured in the same newspaper in 1964.

Preparation

Raw chicken parts are skinned then marinated in a mixture of dahi (yogurt) and tandoori masala, a spice blend. They are seasoned and colored with cayenne pepper, red chili powder, or Kashmiri red chili powder as well as turmeric or food coloring.

The marinated chicken is placed on skewers and cooked at high temperatures in a tandoor oven, which is heated with charcoal or wood, which adds to the smoky flavour. The dish can also be cooked in a standard oven, using a spit or rotisserie, or over hot charcoal.

There are also tandoori recipes for whole chicken, some of which are cooked in a tandoor and others over charcoal. These include Chirga (Roasted whole chicken); Tandoori Murgh (Roast whole chicken with almonds); Murgh Kabab Seekhi (Whole stuffed chicken on the spit); Kookarh Tandoori (Steamed chicken on spit); Tandoori Murgh Massaledarh (Whole spiced chicken on spit); and Murghi Bhogar (Chicken in the Bhogar style).

Cuisine
Tandoori chicken can be eaten as a starter or appetizer, or as a main course, often served with naan flatbread. It is also used as the base of numerous cream-based curries, such as butter chicken. Local varieties of tandoori chicken prepared from the rooyi posto in Bengal have appeared in local eateries, particularly those between Kolaghat and Kolkata. Tandoori chicken was popularized in post-independence India by Moti Mahal, Daryaganj in Delhi when it was served to the first Prime Minister of India, Jawaharlal Nehru. There, tandoori chicken became a standard offering at official banquets.

Variations
The fame of tandoori chicken led to many derivatives, such as chicken tikka (and eventually the Indian dish popularized in Britain, chicken tikka masala), commonly found in menus in Indian restaurants all over the world. Nearly all derivatives of tandoori chicken begin with a yogurt and citrus-based marinade.

See also

 Indian cuisine
 List of chicken dishes
 Pakistani cuisine
 Punjabi cuisine
 Tandoori masala
 Butter chicken

Notes

References

External links

 Tandoori Chicken. Cook's Illustrated. 

Grilled skewers
Indian cuisine
Punjabi cuisine
North Indian cuisine
Pakistani cuisine
Bengali cuisine
Indian chicken dishes
Desi culture
Baked foods
Indo-Caribbean cuisine